Puerto Rico Highway 203 (PR-203), also known as the Expreso Chayanne (after the artist who lived in San Lorenzo, Puerto Rico, as a child), is a highway which connects Gurabo, Puerto Rico at PR-30 with its parallel route Puerto Rico Highway 183 in San Lorenzo. It is the main route to San Lorenzo and is about 7 kilometers long. It is a dangerous highway, as steep grading is present going down and then going up.

Major intersections

See also

 List of highways numbered 203

References

External links
 

203